Barsham is a civil parish in the English county of Norfolk, and includes the villages of East Barsham, North Barsham, West Barsham and Houghton St Giles. The villages are all situated within 2 miles of each other, about 3 miles north of the town of Fakenham and 28 miles north-west of the city of Norwich. The headwaters of the River Stiffkey flow through both East and North Barsham and Houghton St Giles.

Originally all four villages had their own parishes, but these were merged to create a single civil parish in 1935. This parish has an area of 7½ square miles and in the 2001 census had a population of 253 in 115 households, the population reducing to 232 at the 2011 census. For the purposes of local government, the parish falls within the district of North Norfolk.

There are no shops in Barsham, and the White Horse Inn in East Barsham is the only pub.

The mediaeval pilgrimage centre of Walsingham lies only 1¼ miles north of Houghton St Giles, and the Roman Catholic National Shrine of Our Lady or Slipper Chapel is located within the civil parish of Barsham. East Barsham Manor, in the village of East Barsham, is an important work of Tudor architecture.

The Wymondham to Wells Branch railway line ran through the parish, but this closed during the Beeching Axe of the 1960s.

References

 Ordnance Survey (2002). OS Explorer Map 251 - Norfolk Coast Central. .
 Great Britain Historical GIS Project. Barsham CP Norfolk through time. Retrieved 22 December 2005.
 Office for National Statistics & Norfolk County Council (2001). Census population and household counts for unparished urban areas and all parishes. Retrieved 2 December 2005.

External links
 for East Barsham.
 for North Barsham.
 for West Barsham.
 for Houghton St Giles.

Villages in Norfolk
Civil parishes in Norfolk
North Norfolk